Isotope effect may refer to:

 Equilibrium isotope effect, see Equilibrium constant#Effect of isotopic substitution
 Isotopic shift, effect of isotopic substitution on spectroscopy
 Kinetic isotope effect, effect of isotopic substitution on chemical reaction rates
 Magnetic isotope effect, when a chemical reaction involves spin-selective processes, such as the radical pair mechanism
 Superconductive transition temperature varying by isotope atomic weight: see BCS theory#Underlying evidence